The Coal and Coke Railway was a railway operated by the Coal and Coke Railway Company in central West Virginia between 1905 and 1916.  The line was made up of branches acquired from other companies and new construction.  It ran from Elkins, West Virginia at its northeastern terminus, to Charleston, West Virginia at its southwestern terminus.  Gassaway, West Virginia was roughly the halfway point in the railway's approximate length of 196 miles.

A portion of the line is currently owned by the Elk River Railroad and is in a state of disrepair. In 2021, work began converting the line between Clendenin and Gilmer Station into a state park called the Elk River Trail, a recreational trail used for hiking, biking, and horseback riding.

References

Defunct West Virginia railroads
Mining railways in the United States
Mining in West Virginia
Predecessors of the Baltimore and Ohio Railroad
Railway companies disestablished in 1916
Railway companies established in 1902
1902 establishments in West Virginia
1916 disestablishments in West Virginia
Coal mining in Appalachia
Rail trails in West Virginia